Matthew Pettinger (born October 22, 1980) is a Canadian former professional ice hockey left winger. He played in the National Hockey League with the Tampa Bay Lightning, Vancouver Canucks and the Washington Capitals. Pettinger was born in Edmonton, Alberta and raised in Victoria, British Columbia.

Playing career
As a youth, Pettinger played in the 1994 Quebec International Pee-Wee Hockey Tournament with a minor ice hockey team from Victoria, British Columbia.

Pettinger was drafted in the 2nd round, 43rd overall, by the Washington Capitals in the 2000 NHL Entry Draft. Before his professional career, Pettinger played a season and a half for the University of Denver Pioneers before joining the Calgary Hitmen of the Western Hockey League (WHL) midway through the 1999–00 season.

Pettinger spent his first few seasons in the National Hockey League (NHL) splitting time between the Washington Capitals and their American Hockey League (AHL) affiliate, the Portland Pirates, before earning a full-time roster spot with the Capitals in 2003–04.  Pettinger played eight games for HDD Olimpija Ljubljana in Slovenia during the 2004–05 NHL lockout, then recorded a career-high 20 goals, 18 assists and 38 points as NHL play resumed the following season.

On February 26, 2008, at the trade deadline, Pettinger was dealt from the Washington Capitals to the Vancouver Canucks for forward Matt Cooke. Beginning the 2008–09 season back in the AHL with the Canucks' minor league affiliate, the Manitoba Moose, Pettinger was claimed on re-entry waivers by the Tampa Bay Lightning on October 21, 2008.  He completed the season with 15 points in 59 games with the Lightning.

Unable to sign with an NHL team in the 2009 off-season, Pettinger returned to the Manitoba Moose, signing a professional try-out contract on October 14, 2009.  Before long, however, injuries to the Vancouver Canucks resulted in him re-signing with his former NHL club on November 2 to a one-year, two-way deal worth the league-minimum $500,000 at the NHL level.  Seven games later, he was sent back to the Moose in expectation of forward Daniel Sedin's return from injury after clearing waivers on November 21. On April 6, 2010 Pettinger was recalled by the Vancouver Canucks. After 422 NHL regular-season games, Pettinger finally made his post-season debut, playing a single game with the Canucks in a 3-2 victory over the Los Angeles Kings in the Western Conference Quarterfinals on April 15, 2010.

On August 6, 2010, Pettinger left North America and signed a one-year contract with German team Kölner Haie of the DEL. After completing a second season with the Sharks, Pettinger opted to remain in the DEL for a third season; however, he signed a one-year deal with the Hamburg Freezers on April 9, 2012.

Career statistics

Regular season and playoffs

International

References

External links

1980 births
Living people
Calgary Hitmen players
Canadian ice hockey left wingers
Canadian people of German descent
Hamburg Freezers players
HDD Olimpija Ljubljana players
Kölner Haie players
Manitoba Moose players
Ice hockey people from Edmonton
Vancouver Canucks players
Victoria Salsa players
Washington Capitals draft picks
Washington Capitals players
Canadian expatriate ice hockey players in Slovenia
Canadian expatriate ice hockey players in Germany